Florida Symphony Orchestra may refer to:

Florida Orchestra
Florida Symphony Youth Orchestras